Peranmai is a 2009 Indian Tamil-language action adventure film, co-written and directed by S. P. Jananathan for his venture and produced by Ayngaran International Films, it stars Jayam Ravi and Roland Kickinger, with Dhansika, Saranya Nag, Varsha Ashwathi, Liyasree and Vasundhara Kashyap in the female leads. While Urvashi, Vadivelu, Ponvannan, prominent actors from the Tamil industry, played supporting roles in the film.

The film revolves around Dhuruvan (Jayam Ravi), a tribal forest guard who works for the welfare of his tribe and spreads awareness among them. While, on a trekking with five college girls, who initially mistreated him due to his caste, they stumble on a group of foreign mercenaries led by Anderson (Roland Kickinger), who are planning to stop India's scientific project by destroying a rocket launch by using a missile. The bonding of team and defeating the potential threat forms the crux of the story.

The film opened to audiences worldwide on 16 October 2009, coinciding with Diwali. The core plot of the movie is loosely based on the 1972 Russian movie The Dawns Here Are Quiet.

Plot
  
Dhuruvan is a trainer at an NCC camp for women cadets. Being from a scheduled caste, he is constantly degraded by his superior Ranger Ganapathiram for his caste and rough persona, and framed for committing inappropriate acts by other cadets, but their warden Victoria sympathizes for him. He selects five girls Jennifer, Ajitha, Thulasi, Susheela and Kalpana who are the most insolent and disobedient girls in the troop for an expedition, intending to provide them with better training. As an attempt to make a practical joke, the girls post a complaint to Ganapathiram claiming that they did not feel safe with Dhuruvan and that he was responsible for whatever happens to them and keeps it in the complaint box. Meanwhile, the expedition begins, and while Dhuruvan is caught up in some procedures at the forest checkpost, the girls buy condoms and other inappropriate items and start the jeep, nonchanlantly driving it and running it down the slope of a hill. After losing the vehicle, the troop decides to stay in the forest for the night and go by an alternate route the next morning. Slowly, the girls starts to bond with Dhuruvan. But the plot thickens when Kalpana sees two foreigners with advanced armaments and in military gear in the Indian forest. Dhuruvan guess that they might are heading towards the direction of the Indian satellite research station in the forest to destroy their project of launching a rocket. He plans that if they want to sabotage the space mission, they would reach the banks of Toonghum Lake within five hours. He knows a better route to go to the safe place in the opposite bank within four-and-a-half hours. He tells the girls to go back and inform Ganapathiram about them and bring extra forces, but the girls disagree and go with Dhuruvan. They reach the opposite bank and to their shock, they find that they are totally 16 men. 

Dhuruvan analyses that the men are out to sabotage the space mission and makes plans to defeat the operation of the foreign mercenaries. He sends Ajitha back to inform the officials, and the rest join him in the operation. She bids them a goodbye and Susheela tells her to tear the complaint letter as they wrote it without understanding Dhuruvan's value, before Ganapathiram sees it. But on the way back, she gets trapped into the quicksand and dies. Dhuruvan manages to lodge their troop ahead of mercenaries by his navigation acumen. Later, he deliberately obstructs the movement of mercenaries by cutting the trees to distract them. Anderson, the leader of the foreign mercenary group, decides to stay back until a clear notion from the opposite side. He deploys two of his men to investigate the situation. However, Dhuruvan successfully kill the two men. Anderson sends another three men Thompson, George and Edwin to the opposite side to find out what happened to the two men whom he had sent; on the other hand, Dhuruvan's troops are eagerly waiting for them to collect their armaments. Dhuruvan kills George and Edwin but Thompson manages to escape. When Anderson finds that he has lost four men of his group, he decides to kill whoever is obstructing him move further.

Dhuruvan's troops cleverly plant the land mines they acquired from one of the four men they killed. As per their expectation, one of the mercenaries steps on a land mine and dies. This scares them, and Anderson and another man Benny decides to go and hunt for the rest of the land mines while the others would set up a camp there. That night, Dhuruvan and his troops break into their camp and seize one of two boxes that the mercenaries carry around with them, expecting it to contain information about the air missile after killing two of them. By the morning, Anderson and Benny finds the two of his men dead and lost one box and gets enraged at Dhuruvan and his troops. He tells Benny to take 3 men to the site of the rocket launch and launch the missile. He takes the rest of his men to destroy Dhuruvan and the girls, which turns into a war. 

On the other side, Ganapathiram finds the complaint letter, gathers his team and goes to the forest checkpoint to find out what happens. The storekeeper tells him what happened and that condoms were purchased. Assuming Dhuruvan kidnapped the girls, Ganapathiram and his officers destroy Dhuruvan's community and their homes, and exile them from the area while degrading their lower caste status. He eventually finds Ajitha's corpse in the quicksand of the river and assumes that Dhuruvan raped and killed her. Ganapathiram frames Dhuruvan as a serial killer to the district collector. The collector issues a shoot-at-sight order for Dhuruvan, with Ganapathiram's permission.

Dhuruvan and the girls kills 3 of the mercenaries who were with Anderson. Benny tells Collin, one of the 3 men who came with him to stay and guard the box, where the missile is. While they goes to help Anderson in the war. After finding their secret signal, Anderson kills Susheela and hangs her from a tree. The girls and Dhuruvan gets heartbroken at the sight of a dead Susheela and buries her with an NCC tribute. The girls kills Thompson and the two other men except Anderson, Benny and Collin. Benny finds Dhuruvan and the girls. He trashes Benny and makes him to lure Anderson after which Dhuruvan kills Benny with the girl's help. He goes in search of Anderson, while the girls go to stop the missile launch. While Dhuruvan goes to find Anderson, Ganapathiram catches Dhuruvan and tries to shoot him. Dhuruvan tries to reveal the situation but fails. Ganapathiram tries to call his men through his walkie-talkie to kill Dhuruvan as he was running out of bullets. Dhuruvan throws the walkie-talkie, beats Ganapathiram and escapes. When Ganapathiram goes to take the walkie-talkie, he realizes the situation when he sees the corpses of the mercenaries and realizes that Dhuruvan killed them. Ganapathiram reveals the situation to the collector and arrogantly tells the collector: "My team is enough. I will put over their dead bodies in front of you".

At the climax, Dhuruvan and Anderson fights face-to-face where Dhuruvan confronts and defeats Anderson, and the girls kills Collin and tries to disarm the counter missile from firing the space rocket. After an intense fight between the men, Dhuruvan manages to kill Anderson. Dhuruvan finally reaches the site of the rocket launch and helps the girls. He increases the time set of the missile by 25 seconds and changes it direction to the left. The Indian space rocket launches from the station and speeds up into the atmosphere. After 25 seconds, the counter missile diverted from its direction explodes into the desolate forest. The troop prides themselves for being successful on their mission, but feel bad for Dhuruvan as his bravery will never be recognized due to his caste. In the end, Ganapathiram is awarded by the Indian government for "bravery", while Dhuruvan is back at the camp training another set of new NCC cadets. The girls bid a tearful goodbye, remembering Ajitha and Susheela.

Cast

Production

Casting
The film was initially written by S. P. Jananathan with Kamal Haasan in mind, but his refusal prompted the director to sign Jayam Ravi.

Jayam Ravi underwent physical training for the role of a forest officer in this film. He plays a one-man army in this film similar to that of Sylvester Stallone in Rambo.

Actors Dhansika, Saranya Nag, Varsha Ashwathi, Liyasree and Vasundhara Kashyap played the lead female roles.

Soundtrack

All lyrics were written by Vairamuthu

"Kaattu Puli Adichu" by Kay Kay and Jassie Gift
"Kaadu Kaalai Katta" by Madhu Balakrishnan
"Yera Thala" by Sadhana Sargam
"When The Boys" by Sonia Irabar and Sianed Jones
"Thuppaaki Penne" by Pop Shalini, Megha, Febi and SuVi

Critical reception
Sify wrote " Here is a definitive movie with a moral framework, and commitment along with a stunning and realistic climax" and also praising Jayam Ravi's acting.

Release
The satellite rights of the film were secured by Sun TV. The film was given a "U/A" certificate by the Indian Censor Board.

References

External links
 
 

2009 films
2000s Tamil-language films
Films scored by Vidyasagar
Indian action adventure films
Films directed by S. P. Jananathan
Films based on Russian novels
Films based on works by Boris Vasilyev
Indian remakes of foreign films